Lupin is the third Korean extended play (EP) by South Korean girl group Kara, released on February 17, 2010 by DSP. The concept and artwork of the album is based on French writer Maurice Leblanc's fictional gentleman thief, Arsène Lupin.

Background and concept
In early February, DSP Media announced that Kara would be coming back with "Lupin" and showing a darker, more mature concept.  The song was released to digital outlets on February 17, 2010 and topped various charts the following day.

Han Seung-yeon noted that, although the group had a cute image with singles like "Pretty Girl" and "Mister", "Lupin" would allow the girls to portray a "chic" concept. The group then performed on all major network music shows over the weekend.

On March 4, 2010, Kara won their first #1 award for "Lupin" on M! Countdown. The following week, Kara won yet another #1 award on M! Countdown, making it their second consecutive win on the program. "Lupin" also gave Kara their first #1 win on Music Bank on March 12, 2010, making it the group's first win on the music show since their debut, and held onto the position for three consecutive weeks.  The song also won the Mutizen award from Inkigayo.

"Lupin" is among a handful of Kara tracks featured in the arcade music game, DJ Max Technika 3.

Music video
The music video was released on February 22, garnering more than 90,000 views in the first two hours. After the popularity of the group's "butt dance" with "Mister", netizens were curious to see the choreography of "Lupin"; as such, parts of the dance, including the "Emergency Exit" dance and the "Halla" dance, were highlighted by viewers.  Other moves of interest were Goo Hara's hair flip.

Track listing

Charts

Album chart

Single chart

Other songs charted

Sales and certifications

Release history

References

2010 EPs
Dance-pop EPs
Kara (South Korean group) EPs
Korean-language EPs